The Jamshidi needle is a trephine needle for performing bone marrow biopsy, whereby a cylindrical sample of tissue, a core biopsy specimen, is obtained. It is a cylindrical needle with a tapered cutting tip. The tapered end reduces the potential of crush artifact. It is the most commonly used needle for performing bone marrow biopsies. The device is named for its inventor Khosrow Jamshidi who is an Iranian physician.

See also
Instruments used in general surgery

References

Surgical instruments
Cutting tools